= MultiWeb Internet Browser =

MultiWeb Internet Browser was an early freeware Windows web browser for those with disabilities.

The browser was developed by the Equity Access Research and Development Group at Deakin University under a grant from the Australian Commonwealth Department of Health and Family Services. An email client called MultiMail was also developed.
